Monacanthus chinensis, commonly known as the fan-bellied leatherjacket or fantail leatherjacket, is a species of filefish native to the western Pacific Ocean and the eastern Indian Ocean where it is found on reefs and soft sediments at shallow depths.

Description
It is a laterally-compressed fish recognisable by the upturned, pointed snout, the filamentary extension on the fan-shaped caudal fin, and the large dewlap on the underside of the fish. The foremost dorsal fin consists of a long erectile spine with a shorter one behind it. The hindermost dorsal fin has 28 to 34 soft rays and the anal fin has 27 to 34 soft rays. The colour is variable depending on its environment, being dark when swimming over beds of mussels and cream or tan when above a sandy seabed. In each case there are irregular darker blotches and streaks.

Distribution and habitat
The fan-bellied leatherjacket is native to the Indo-Pacific. Its range extends from Malaysia and southern Japan, through Indonesia and Samoa to western, northern and eastern Australia.

Biology
The fan-bellied leatherjacket is diurnal and omnivorous, appearing to detect its food by sight. Besides feeding on algae and seagrass, it preys on small invertebrates such as amphipods, caridean shrimps, copepods, tanaids, bryozoans, hydroids, polychaete worms and tunicates.  It does not appear to digest seagrass and algae well, but nevertheless, many carbon compounds are assimilated from these foodstuffs during the digestion process. About 40% of the diet is animal matter, and this species is very dependent on encrusting organisms and the epiphytic algae and invertebrates present in a seagrass meadow.

References

External links
 

Monacanthidae
Taxa named by Pehr Osbeck
Fish described in 1765